The 2011–12 season is the 122nd season of competitive football in Denmark.

Club football

Domestic football

Superliga

The 22nd edition of the Danish Superliga is set to start on 16 July 2011 and end on 25 May 2012.

League table

First Division

The First Division is set to start on 12 August 2011 and end on 10 June 2012.

League table

Second Division

The Second Divisions are set to begin on 7 August 2011 and end on 16 June 2012.

League tables

Cup

The Cup is scheduled to play its first round matches on 9–11 August 2011 and hold its final on Ascension day, 17 May.

Continental football
For the first time since the 2000–01 season, two Danish teams would participate in the UEFA Champions League. F.C. Copenhagen qualified for the champions' path's third qualifying round as Danish champions, and OB qualified for the league path's third qualifying round as runners-up.

FC Nordsjælland qualified for the play-offs of the Europa League as cup winners, while Brøndby IF qualified as third in the league for the third qualifying round and FC Midtjylland qualified for the second qualifying round as fourth in the league.

Champions League

F.C. Copenhagen and OB entered in the third qualifying round and although they both qualified for the play-off round, they both lost in this round and thus dropped into the 2011–12 UEFA Europa League tournament.

Europa League

FC Nordsjælland entered in the play-offs, Brøndby IF entered in the third qualifying round where they were eliminated by Austrian SV Ried, FC Midtjylland entered in the second qualifying round and made it to the third qualifying round, losing out to Vitória SC.

National team football

Men's national football team

The men's national football team ended their qualifying campaign for Euro 2012 with three victories over Norway, Cyprus and Portugal, securing the overall group win and qualification for their first European Championship since 2004.

Euro 2012

Euro 2012 finals

Denmark were drawn into the so-called "group of death" for the tournament along with 2010 FIFA World Cup finalists Netherlands, third-place finishers Germany, as well as eighth-finalists Portugal.

Friendlies

Another friendly match date is set for 29 February 2012.

Women's national football team

The women's national team will begin their qualification for UEFA Women's Euro 2013, where they will attempt to make their first appearance since 2005.

Euro 2013 qualifying

Algarve Cup

The team will take part in the 2012 Algarve Cup.

Men's national under-21 team

The men's under-21 side will begin their qualification towards the 2013 U-21 European Championship in Israel.

U-21 Euro 2013 qualifying

Men's youth national teams

The men's under-19 team will begin qualification for the 2012 UEFA European Under-19 Football Championship in Estonia. In the qualifying, they are placed in Group 12 alongside Austria (who will host the group), Malta and Albania. Should they finish in the top 2, or as the best third placed team of the 12 groups, they will qualify for the elite round.

The under-17 team will attempt to qualify for the 2012 UEFA European Under-17 Football Championship in Slovenia. Denmark will host Group 5 of the initial qualifying round and face Italy, Austria and Cyprus. A top 2 finish or a record as one of the two best teams in third position will qualify the squad for the elite round of qualifying.

References

 
Den
Seasons in Danish football